Victor Herbert is an outdoor bronze portrait bust of Victor Herbert by Edmond Thomas Quinn, located in Central Park in Manhattan, New York.

History
The memorial sculpture, commissioned by the American Society of Composers, Authors, and Publishers (ASCAP), was unveiled by Herbert's daughter in 1927 at a dedication attended by Irving Berlin and Arthur Hammerstein.

References

External links 
 

1927 establishments in New York City
1927 sculptures
Bronze sculptures in Central Park
Busts in New York City
Monuments and memorials in Manhattan
Outdoor sculptures in Manhattan